Joaquín Bernadó y Bartoméu (16 August 1935 – 21 February 2022) was a Spanish matador.

Biography
At the age of 15, Bernadó abandoned his business studies and began bullfighting. He participated in his first  on 28 May 1950 in Manresa. He began his first season in Vista Alegre on 25 April 1954, in which he took part in 41 novilladas with limited success. His first alternativa took place on 4 March 1956 in Castellón de la Plana with his godfather  and witness . He took part in 32 bullfights in his first year as an alternativa.

Bernadó died in Madrid on 21 February 2022, at the age of 86.

References

1935 births
2022 deaths
Spanish bullfighters
Sportspeople from Santa Coloma de Gramenet